Patryk Mauer (born 2 September 1998) is a Polish handball player for Gwardia Opole and the Polish national team.

References

1998 births
Living people
Polish male handball players
People from Legnica